Sevki bin Shaban (born 2 May 1984) is a former Singapore international footballer who played as a defender in the S.League.

Club career
Previously, he played for Sembawang Rangers and Gombak United.  Signed for Geylang United for the AFC 2010 competition, he had a serious injury and thus making season 2010 one for him to forget.

International career
Selected for the National Team by Radojko Avramović for the national squad, and earn his 1st cap against Vietnam in 2008.

External links
 
 
 

Singaporean footballers
Singapore international footballers
Geylang International FC players
Living people
1984 births
LionsXII players
Sembawang Rangers FC players
Gombak United FC players
Association football defenders
Singapore Premier League players
Young Lions FC players
Home United FC players
Southeast Asian Games bronze medalists for Singapore
Southeast Asian Games medalists in football
Competitors at the 2007 Southeast Asian Games